The São José dos Dourados River (Portuguese, Rio São José dos Dourados) is a river of São Paulo state in southeastern Brazil. It is a tributary of the Paraná River, which it joins just upriver of Ilha Solteira Dam.

See also
 List of rivers of São Paulo
 Tributaries of the Río de la Plata

References

Brazilian Ministry of Transport

Rivers of São Paulo (state)
Tributaries of the Paraná River